Eastside Cannery Casino and Hotel is a locals casino on the Boulder Strip in Sunrise Manor, Nevada, owned and operated by Boyd Gaming. The Eastside Cannery has  of casino space, 307 hotel rooms, a special events ballroom, a private club on the 16th floor, one restaurant and two bars.

History 
Eastside Cannery Casino and Hotel opened in August 2008, replacing the Nevada Palace, located on the same site since 1979. Nevada Palace closed in February 2008, about two years after the property was purchased by Cannery Casino Resorts. It was torn down in phases as the new property was built behind it; the exact Nevada Palace site is now the current casino's parking lot. All Nevada Palace employees were offered other positions within the Cannery organization, and many were retained as Eastside Cannery staff. 
The $250 million facility was the first major casino to open in more than a decade on Las Vegas’ eastside. It features approximately 2,000 slot machines, 26 table games, a race and sports book and stands 16 stories tall.

The property became part of Boyd Gaming in December 2016 through its acquisition of Cannery Casino Resorts.

State casinos were ordered to close in March 2020, due to the COVID-19 pandemic in Nevada. Most casinos reopened later that year, although the Eastside Cannery remains closed as of 2021.

References

External links
Eastside Cannery Casino and Hotel

Casinos in the Las Vegas Valley
Hotels in the Las Vegas Valley
Skyscraper hotels in the Las Vegas Valley
Hotel buildings completed in 2008
Buildings and structures in Sunrise Manor, Nevada
Boyd Gaming
Cannery Casino Resorts
Casino hotels
2008 establishments in Nevada
Casinos completed in 2008